Dixie, subtitled "The Second War Between the States", is a board wargame published by Simulations Publications, Inc. (SPI) in 1976 that simulates an alternate world where the Union lost the first American Civil War, and there is a second war between the North and the South in the early part of the 20th century.

Gameplay
In this game's setting, after the Confederacy emerged from the American Civil War as an independent country, the North and South have gone to war again in the 1930s. The game itself is a two-player  brigade/division-level wargame.

Components
The game includes:
22" x 17" paper map
four player aid sheets
rulebook
100 die-cut counters
randomizer chits (to replace dice)

Administration points
Dixie was the first wargame to use Administration Points as a way of regulating how much can be accomplished in a turn. In each turn, the players are given a certain number of Administration points, and use them to "buy" actions. For example, bringing a replacement infantry division onto the board costs two Administration points.

Scenarios
The game includes three scenarios set in 1936 and 1937.

Publication history
In 1976, Redmond Simonsen's alternate world wargame Dixie was published as a pull-out game in issue #116 of Strategy & Tactics. SPI also published it as a stand-alone product packaged in a cardstock folio.

Reception
Writing in Ares Magazine #1, Eric Goldberg was not impressed by Dixie, commenting that "it could be titled 'How Not to Design a Wargame'." Goldberg's biggest issues were that both sides start with equal forces, and that the player best able to manage the Administration Points system would win the game despite mediocre gameplay. He concluded by giving Dixie a very poor rating of only 2 out of 9, saying, "one should not waste time or money on Dixie, but students of the history of wargames might be interested to know that the concept of Administrative Points was invented with this game."

In his 1977 book The Comprehensive Guide to Board Wargaming, Nick Palmer thought the idea of redoing the Civil War with 20th century weapons "has a zany appeal", but noted that in a poll conducted by SPI, over two-thirds of the wargamers who took the poll knew this game, but most gave it a negative rating.

Board Game Wizard included Dixie in its list of "Best Board Games of the 70's", saying, "Kind of a weird alternate history really, but some players did enjoy a couple of games, although it didn’t engage that well overall."

Other reviews and commentary
Moves #61
JagdPanther #13

References

Board wargames
Simulations Publications games
Wargames introduced in 1976